Go is the debut studio album by Icelandic musician Jónsi, frontman of the post-rock band Sigur Rós. The album was released on 5 April 2010, through XL Recordings, as reported by a downloadable track from the official site. The fourth track of the album, "Boy Lilikoi", was released for free from Jónsi's website, available to those subscribing to the website's mailing list.

The album features predominantly acoustic music and string arrangements from composer Nico Muhly. The album was co-produced by Alex Somers, Peter Katis and Jónsi himself, during summer 2009, in Reykjavík and Connecticut. A worldwide tour across North America and Europe also took place upon the album's release from April–May 2010, featuring Jónsi performing songs from the album and a "unique, cinematic" performance stage designed by 59 Productions.

"Kolniður" was featured at the end of the Criminal Minds sixth-season episode "Lauren" and in a trailer for Real Steel. It also featured at the end of the first-season finale of the reality series Flying Wild Alaska. "Around Us" was included on the FIFA 11 and FIFA 23 soundtrack and the trailer for the Disney dub of The Secret World of Arrietty.

"Tornado" was featured in the film Disconnect, at the closing scene and ending credits, which got overall positive critical praise.

Reception

Go has received mostly positive reviews from critics, scoring a 76/100 on the music review aggregator website Metacritic. Most reviews praise Muhly's precise arrangements and Jónsi's flighty vocals, while a few lukewarm reviews discuss the album's lack of cohesion. The album has reached number twenty on the UK Albums Chart, number twenty-three on the Billboard 200 in the United States, number six on the Belgian (Flanders) Ultratop chart, number thirty-one on the Swiss Albums Top 100, number seventy-four on the Italian Music Chart and number eighty-four on the Dutch Mega Album Top 100.

Track listing
 "Go Do" – 4:41
 "Animal Arithmetic" – 3:24
 "Tornado" – 4:15
 "Boy Lilikoi" – 4:30
 "Sinking Friendships" – 4:42
 "Kolniður" – 3:56
 "Around Us" – 5:18
 "Grow till Tall" – 5:21
 "Hengilás" – 4:15

Japanese bonus tracks
 "Sinking Friendships" (acoustic) – 4:00
 "Tornado" (acoustic) – 3:57

Personnel
 Jón Þór Birgisson – vocals, sampler, guitar, piano, ukulele, glockenspiel
 Samuli Kosminen – drums, percussion, kalimba, harp
 Nico Muhly – piano, celesta, glockenspiel, string arrangement, brass arrangement, wind arrangement
 Alex Somers – guitar, piano, celesta, glockenspiel, sampler

Additional musicians
 Hideaki Aomori – clarinet
 Edward Burns – bassoon
 Christa Robinson – oboe, English horn
 Alexandra Sopp – flutes
 William Lang – bass trombone
 David Nelson – trombone
 David Byrd-Marrow, Kate Sheeran – French horn
 Caleb Burhans, Courtney Orlando – violin
 Nadia Sirota, John Pickford Richards – viola
 Clarice Jenson, Brian Snow – cello
 Logan Coale – double bass

Technical
 Jón Þór Birgisson – writer, producer
 Alex Somers – producer
 Peter Katis – producer, engineer
 Greg Giorgio – assistant engineer

Charts

References

2010 debut albums
Jónsi albums
Post-rock albums by Icelandic artists